Maip Mulitaka Rural LLG is a local-level government (LLG) of Enga Province, Papua New Guinea.

Wards
01. Tumudane
02. Walya
03. Yeim
04. Yalum
05. Tombaip
06. Rumbapes
07. Yambali
08. Mulitaka
09. Torenam
10. Malaumanda
11. Lauk
12. Tokom (Winjak)
13. Lemong/Poreak
14. Kaundak
15. Pokolip
16. Yuyango
17. Puaipak
18. Paitengis
19. Ipalopa

References

Local-level governments of Enga Province